Arab Egypt may refer to 
Egypt after the Arab conquest of AD 639, see History of Muslim Egypt
modern Egypt under a state doctrine of Pan-Arabism, see
United Arab Republic (1958-1971)
Arab Republic of Egypt (1971-present)
Arab Egyptians